María Revuelto Sánchez-Aguilera (born 27 January 1982) is a Spanish basketball player who competed in the 2008 Summer Olympics.

References

1982 births
Living people
Spanish women's basketball players
Olympic basketball players of Spain
Basketball players at the 2008 Summer Olympics